This is a list of football (soccer) clubs in Lithuania that played in A Lyga (the highest league), Lyga 1 (second-tier league), or Lyga 2 (third-tier) from 2003 to 2007. In 2007 a separate league for Reserve teams and feeder teams was created.

Clubs

See also 
List of football teams

External links 
  League321.com - Club stats records.

 
Lithuania
Clubs
Football